Pascoe Vale railway station is located on the Craigieburn line in Victoria, Australia. It serves the northern Melbourne suburb of Pascoe Vale, and opened on 10 November 1885.

History
Pascoe Vale station opened on 10 November 1885, with the railway line past the site of the station originally opening in 1872, as part of the North East line to School House Lane. The station, like the suburb itself, was named after "Pascoeville", a property owned by John Pascoe Fawkner, one of the founders of Melbourne.

The original station building, provided on Platform 1 in 1886, has since been replaced. In 1929, a signal box was provided, which controlled interlocked gates at the Gaffney Street level crossing, until they were replaced with boom barriers in 1965.

Platforms and services

Pascoe Vale has two side platforms. It is served by Craigieburn line trains.

Platform 1:
  all stations services to Flinders Street

Platform 2:
  all stations services to Craigieburn

Transport links
Dysons operates two routes to and from Pascoe Vale station, under contract to Public Transport Victoria:
 : to Roxburgh Park station
 : to Macleod

Gallery

References

External links
 Melway map at street-directory.com.au

Railway stations in Melbourne
Railway stations in Australia opened in 1885
Railway stations in the City of Merri-bek